The 2015 Polish Speedway season was the 2015 season of motorcycle speedway in Poland.

Individual

Polish Individual Speedway Championship
The 2015 Individual Speedway Polish Championship final was held on 5 July at Gorzów. Maciej Janowski won the Polish Championship for the first time.

Golden Helmet
The 2015 Golden Golden Helmet organised by the Polish Motor Union (PZM) was the 2015 event for the league's leading riders. The final was held at Lublin on the 12 April. Przemysław Pawlicki won the Golden Helmet for the second consecutive year.

Junior Championship
 winner - Bartosz Zmarzlik

Silver Helmet
 winner - Kacper Woryna

Bronze Helmet
 winner - Maksym Drabik

Pairs

Polish Pairs Speedway Championship
The 2015 Polish Pairs Speedway Championship was the 2015 edition of the Polish Pairs Speedway Championship. The final was held on 12 July at Leszno.

Team

Team Speedway Polish Championship
The 2015 Team Speedway Polish Championship was the 2015 edition of the Team Polish Championship. Unia Leszno won the gold medal. The team included the Pawlicki brothers, Nicki Pedersen and Emil Sayfutdinov.

Ekstraliga

Play offs

1.Liga

Play offs

2.Liga

Play offs

References

Poland Individual
Poland Team
Speedway
2015 in Polish speedway